The 2016 World Junior Short Track Speed Skating Championships took place from 29 to 31 January 2016 in Sofia, Bulgaria.

Medal summary

Medal table

Men's events
The results of the Championships:

Women's events

Participating nations

See also
Short track speed skating
World Junior Short Track Speed Skating Championships

References

External links
 Official website
Results book

World Junior Short Track Speed Skating Championships
World Junior Short Track Speed Skating Championships
World Junior Short Track Speed Skating Championships
International speed skating competitions hosted by Bulgaria
Sports competitions in Sofia
World Junior Short Track Speed Skating Championships
World Junior Short Track Speed Skating Championships